In architecture, patera (pl. paterae) is an ornamental circular or oval bas-relief disc. The patera is usually used to decorate friezes and walls, and to interrupt moldings. Patera is also used in furniture-making. It can be carved, incised, inlaid, or even painted.

Overview
The patera is found in the ancient Roman architecture and in almost all later western styles of architecture. The patera is used both within the civil and church architecture is usually made of marble or Istrian stone. It has a variable diameter between 20 and 80 cm, while the thickness is around 10 cm. The subject represented in the bas-relief is generally of floral or animal type, but there are also figures symbolizing trades or people. Being mainly a decorative element, the patera may also perform an apotropaic function to keep away evil spirits.

Gallery

References

Architectural sculpture
Visual motifs
Amulets
Talismans